Hildur Isabella Boylston (born October 13, 1986) is an American ballet dancer who is currently a principal dancer with the American Ballet Theatre (ABT).

Early life
Boylston was born Hildur Isabella Boylston, named for an Icelandic great-grandmother, in Sun Valley, Idaho. Her father Mike was an American country-blues drummer and "ski bum" while her mother Cornelia was a Swedish engineer.

When she was seven, her family moved to Boulder, Colorado, where she started training at the Boulder Ballet. By the age of 12, she had started studies at the Colorado Ballet Academy. During that time, she won a gold medal at the 2001 Youth America Grand Prix Finals in New York City.

In 2002, she received a full scholarship to train at the HARID Conservatory in Boca Raton, Florida. During her time there she worked with choreographer Mark Godden and danced leading roles such as Medora in Le Corsaire, the Paquita pas de trois, Lise in La fille mal gardée and the Sugarplum Fairy in The Nutcracker. In 2004, she received the Reuger Scholarship for excellence in dance.  She participated in summer programs at the School of American Ballet, the Boston Ballet and the American Ballet Theatre.

Career

In 2005, Boylston joined the ABT Studio Company and became an apprentice with the main company in May 2006. She joined the corps de ballet in March 2007, was promoted to soloist in June 2011 and principal in August 2014. Lead roles she danced include Nikiya in La Bayadère, Kitri in Don Quixote and Columbine in Harlequinade. Boylston won the Princess Grace Award in 2009 and was nominated for the 2010 Prix Benois de la Danse.

Outside of ABT, she also designed costumes for the Pacific Northwest Ballet's 2010 production of Benjamin Millepied's 3 Movements, a ballet set to Steve Reich's Three Movements for Orchestra. She has appeared as a guest artist with the Mariinsky Ballet in St. Petersburg and the Royal Danish Ballet. Boylston also served as Jennifer Lawrence's dance double in 2018 film Red Sparrow, choreographed by Justin Peck. In 2019, she helped breaking the Guinness World Record for the most dancers ever to go on pointe at the same time, alongside James Whiteside on Live with Kelly and Ryan.

Alastair Macaulay of the New York Times noted Boylston portrayal of Lise in La Fille mal gardée is "intimate, heartfelt, rapturous."  On Swan Lake, Macaulay praised Boylston's musicality and phrasing.

In 2020, Boylston participated in Misty Copeland's fundraiser, Swans for Relief, by dancing The Swan, in light of the impacts of the 2019-20 coronavirus pandemic on the dance community. The fund will go to participating dancers' companies and other related relief funds.

Selected repertoire
Boylston's repertory with the American Ballet Theatre includes:

Personal life
Boylston is married to financier Daniel Shin. They live in Brooklyn, New York.

See also 

 List of female dancers

References

External links
 
 Isabella Boylston at American Ballet Theatre

1986 births
Living people
People from Sun Valley, Idaho
American Ballet Theatre principal dancers
American ballerinas
Princess Grace Awards winners
Dancers from Idaho
Prima ballerinas
21st-century American ballet dancers
American people of Icelandic descent
American people of Swedish descent
21st-century American women